"Dance All Night" is a song by DeBarge released as the first single from their fifth studio album Bad Boys.

The song peaked at number 33 on the U.S. R&B chart in 1987.

Charts

1987 singles
DeBarge songs
1987 songs
Songs written by El DeBarge